This is a list of German television related events from 1969.

Events
22 February - Siw Malmkvist is selected to represent Germany at the 1969 Eurovision Song Contest with her song "Primaballerina". She is selected to be the fourteenth German Eurovision entry during Ein Lied für Madrid held at the HR Studios in Frankfurt.

Debuts

Domestic
3 January - Der Kommissar (1969–1976) (ZDF)
13 January - Königlich Bayerisches Amtsgericht  (1969–1971) (ZDF)
29 January - Salto Mortale (1969–1972) (ARD)
19 March - Percy Stuart (1969–1972) (ZDF)

Television shows

1950s
Tagesschau (1952–present)

1960s
 heute (1963-present)

Ending this year

Births

Deaths